Associação Botafogo Futebol Clube, also known as Botafogo or Botafogo-DF, is a Brazilian football club based in Cristalina, in Goiás. The club was formerly known as Clube Esportivo Guará.

History
The club was founded on July 14, 2004 as Clube Esportivo Guará. The club won the Campeonato Brasiliense Second Level in 2006. It was founded again as Associação Botafogo Futebol Clube on July 14, 2009, after celebrating its five-year birthday  and joining a partnership with Botafogo de Futebol e Regatas, adopting the colors and symbols from the Rio de Janeiro club. In its first season, Botafogo-DF finished as runners-up in the Campeonato Brasiliense Second Level gaining promotion to the First Level of the Campeonato Brasiliense, in 2010, even after being defeated 2–1 in the final to Ceilandense.

In 2022, the club moved to the city of Cristalina, at the state of Goiás, leaving the city of Guará.

Achievements

 Campeonato Brasiliense Second Level:
 Winners (1): 2006
 Runners-up (1): 2009

Stadium
Associação Botafogo Futebol Clube play their home games at Estádio Antônio Otoni Filho, nicknamed CAVE. The stadium has a maximum capacity of 7,000 people.

References

External links
 Official website

Association football clubs established in 2004
Association football clubs established in 2009
Football clubs in Federal District (Brazil)
2004 establishments in Brazil